A unit fraction is a rational number written as a fraction where the numerator is one and the denominator is a positive integer.  A unit fraction is therefore the reciprocal of a positive integer, 1/n.  Examples are 1/1, 1/2, 1/3, 1/4, 1/5, etc.

Arithmetic

Elementary arithmetic
Multiplying any two unit fractions results in a product that is another unit fraction:

However, adding, subtracting, or dividing two unit fractions produces a result that is generally not a unit fraction:

Modular arithmetic
In modular arithmetic, unit fractions can often be converted into equivalent integers using a calculation based on greatest common divisors. In turn, this conversion can be used to simplify division operations in modular arithmetic, by transforming them into equivalent multiplication operations. Specifically, consider the problem of dividing by a value  modulo . In order for this division to be well defined,  and  must be relatively prime. When they are, the extended Euclidean algorithm for the greatest common divisor can be used to find integers  and  such that Bézout's identity is satisfied:

In modulo- arithmetic, the term  can be eliminated as it is zero modulo . This leaves

Equivalently,

Combinations

Finite sums

Any positive rational number can be written as the sum of unit fractions, in multiple ways.  For example,

The ancient Egyptian civilisations  used sums of distinct unit fractions in their notation for more general rational numbers, and so such sums are often called Egyptian fractions.  There is still interest today in analyzing the methods used by the ancients to choose among the possible representations for a fractional number, and to calculate with such representations. The topic of Egyptian fractions has also seen interest in modern number theory; for instance, the Erdős–Graham conjecture and the Erdős–Straus conjecture concern sums of unit fractions, as does the definition of Ore's harmonic numbers.

In geometric group theory, triangle groups are classified into Euclidean, spherical, and hyperbolic cases according to whether an associated sum of unit fractions is equal to one, greater than one, or less than one respectively.

Infinite series

Many well-known infinite series have terms that are unit fractions. These include:
 The harmonic series, the sum of all positive unit fractions. This sum diverges, and its partial sums  closely approximate the natural logarithm of  plus the Euler–Mascheroni constant. Changing every other addition to a subtraction produces the alternating harmonic series, which sums to the natural logarithm of 2: 
 The Leibniz formula for π is 
 The Basel problem concerns the sum of the square unit fractions:  Similarly, Apéry's constant is an irrational number, the sum of the cubed unit fractions.
 The binary geometric series is

Matrices
The Hilbert matrix is the matrix with elements

It has the unusual property that all elements in its inverse matrix are integers. Similarly,  defined a matrix with elements

where Fi denotes the ith Fibonacci number. He calls this matrix the Filbert matrix and it has the same property of having an integer inverse.

Adjacency and Ford circles

However, some pairs of fractions whose difference is a unit fraction are not adjacent in this sense: for instance,  and  differ by a unit fraction, but are not adjacent, because for them .

Applications

In probability and statistics
In a uniform distribution on a discrete space, all probabilities are equal unit fractions. Due to the principle of indifference, probabilities of this form arise frequently in statistical calculations. Additionally, Zipf's law states that, for many observed phenomena involving the selection of items from an ordered sequence, the probability that the nth item is selected is proportional to the unit fraction 1/n.

In physics
The energy levels of photons that can be absorbed or emitted by a hydrogen atom are, according to the Rydberg formula, proportional to the differences of two unit fractions. An explanation for this phenomenon is provided by the Bohr model, according to which the energy levels of electron orbitals in a hydrogen atom are inversely proportional to square unit fractions, and the energy of a photon is quantized to the difference between two levels.

Arthur Eddington argued that the fine-structure constant was a unit fraction, first 1/136 then 1/137. This contention has been falsified, given that current estimates of the fine structure constant are (to 6 significant digits) 1/137.036.

See also 
 Submultiple

References

External links 

Fractions (mathematics)
1 (number)
Elementary arithmetic
Integers